John Ulick Knatchbull, 7th Baron Brabourne,  (9 November 1924 – 23 September 2005), professionally known as John Brabourne, was a British peer, television producer and Oscar-nominated film producer. Married to the eldest daughter of the 1st Earl Mountbatten, Brabourne was a survivor of the bombing which killed his father-in-law, mother and son.

Biography
Brabourne was born in 1924, the second son of Michael Knatchbull, 5th Baron Brabourne, and his wife, Lady Doreen Browne. He was educated at Eton College and Brasenose College, Oxford. He was barely 14 when his father died in February 1939 and his elder brother, Norton, inherited the Barony.

War and inheritance
The Second World War broke out just as Brabourne was finishing school, and he enlisted in the armed forces. He served in the Coldstream Guards, rising to the rank of captain. He fought in France from 1944 onwards. In 1943, his elder brother, Norton, a lieutenant in the Grenadier Guards, was wounded and captured in Italy. While being transported to Germany as a POW, he tried to escape, but was captured and executed by the SS on 15 September 1943. Since he died childless, his barony passed to his younger brother, John Knatchbull, who became the 7th Lord Brabourne.

Marriage
At the end of the war, Brabourne returned to England and settled in the family seat, Mersham in Kent. On 26 October 1946, at Romsey Abbey in Hampshire, at the age of 21, he married Patricia Mountbatten, elder daughter of Louis Mountbatten, 1st Viscount Mountbatten, later 1st Earl Mountbatten of Burma. Brabourne's best man at the wedding was Squadron Leader Charles Harris-St. John.

Lady Brabourne was to inherit her father's peerages in due course. This would make Lord and Lady Brabourne among the few married couples to each hold peerages in their own right. Also, Lady Brabourne was related to the British royal family, and her aunt Louise Mountbatten was at that time the Crown Princess (later Queen) of Sweden. In February 1947, only months after the wedding, Brabourne's father-in-law was appointed Viceroy of India. The newly-wed couple spent several months in India, residing with her parents in the viceregal palace. In November the same year, Lady Brabourne's first cousin Philip, Duke of Edinburgh wed Princess Elizabeth, future Queen of the United Kingdom.

Lord and Lady Brabourne had eight children:
 Norton Louis Philip Knatchbull, Lord Romsey – later the 8th Baron Brabourne (born 8 October 1947), married Penelope Eastwood and has issue. 3rd Earl Mountbatten of Burma from 13 June 2017.
 Michael-John Ulick Knatchbull (born 1950)
 Anthony Knatchbull (born/died 6 April 1952)
 Lady Joanna Edwina Doreen Knatchbull (born 1955), married Baron Hubert Pernot du Breuil and later Azriel Zuckerman, and had issue by both.
 Lady Amanda Patricia Victoria Knatchbull – later Lady Amanda Ellingworth (born 26 June 1957), married Charles Ellingworth and had three sons.
 Philip Wyndham Ashley Knatchbull (born 1961)
 Nicholas Timothy Charles Knatchbull (18 November 1964 – 27 August 1979), killed at the age of 14 by an IRA bomb.
 Timothy Knatchbull (born 18 November 1964), twin with his brother Nicholas.

Career and service
In the late 1940s, shortly after leaving the army, Brabourne began working as an assistant production manager for certain television productions, mostly based on war-related themes. He graduated to the role of production manager by the early 1950s, and finally became a producer in his own right in 1958, with Harry Black a romantic story set in India, with war as the distant context. This was followed by Sink the Bismarck! (1960). War, Empire and India were recurrent themes in his work, and A Passage to India (1984) is among his films. His other motion pictures include Murder on the Orient Express (1974), Death on the Nile (1978), and Little Dorrit (1988).

In 1970, he founded Mersham Productions, a production house named after his family seat in Kent, which produced many of his works thereafter. He served as a director of Thames Television (later chairman) and Euston Films from 1978 to 1995, and a director of Thorn EMI from 1981 to 1986.

John Brabourne received two Academy Award nominations for Best Picture, as producer of Romeo and Juliet (1968) and A Passage to India. In 1979, Brabourne was invested as a Fellow of the British Film Institute. In 1993, he was made a Commander of the Order of the British Empire.

He was the subject of This Is Your Life in 1990 when he was surprised by Michael Aspel at the Old Brewery venue in London.

Despite an active career, Brabourne was also a country gentleman, and took his local responsibilities seriously. He served as a governor of various schools, including Norton Knatchbull School (founded by an ancestor  AD) from 1947 to 2000; Wye College in Kent from 1955 to 2000, and Gordonstoun School from 1964 to 1994. He also served as Pro-Chancellor of the University of Kent from 1993 to 1999.

The IRA bombing
On 27 August 1979, while the family was on holiday in Mullaghmore, County Sligo, Lord Brabourne's father-in-law, Earl Mountbatten of Burma, took a number of family members out lobstering on his motorboat, Shadow V, in Donegal Bay. Having planned to murder Mountbatten, the Irish Republican Army (IRA) placed a bomb inside the boat on the night of the 26th. Mountbatten and several members of the party were killed the next morning when the bomb was triggered by an IRA observer onshore who was armed with a radio detonator. The dead included Brabourne's 83-year-old mother, the Dowager Baroness Brabourne, one of his twin 14-year-old sons, Nicholas Knatchbull, and a local boy, 15-year-old Paul Maxwell from County Fermanagh who had been hired for the summer as Mountbatten's boat boy. Brabourne, his wife Patricia, and their other twin son Timothy were severely injured, but survived the attack.

Lord Brabourne died in 2005 at his home in Kent at the age of 80. He was survived by his wife and their six remaining children. Patricia Brabourne died in June 2017.

Ancestry

References and notes

External links

 Tribute & Memorial web-site to Louis, 1st Earl Mountbatten of Burma, mountbattenofburma.com. Accessed 8 December 2022.
Interview with John Brabourne, HistoryProject.org.uk. Accessed 8 December 2022.

1924 births
2005 deaths
Alumni of Brasenose College, Oxford
7
John
British Army personnel of World War II
British film producers
British television producers
Coldstream Guards officers
Commanders of the Order of the British Empire
Brabourne, John Knatchbull, 7th Baron
People educated at Eton College
Younger sons of barons
Brabourne